Oakleigh Grammar is an independent Christian school in the Melbourne, Australia suburb of Oakleigh. It is an International Baccalaureate World School which  currently caters for 800 students from Early Learning [ELC]  to year 12. 

The school was founded in 1983 commencing with a year level range  of Prep  to Year 8. It expanded to a full Independent School offering education from Kindergarten to year 12  in 1999. The name was changed from Oakleigh Greek Orthodox College to Oakleigh Grammar on 1 January 2012.

Sport 
Oakleigh Grammar is a member of the Eastern Independent Schools of Melbourne (EISM) and competes in the Southern Division.  It is also a member of Bentleigh Districts Association in the Primary Division.  In 2022 the Primary [ Years 5/6 ] Soccer team was declared State Champions.

EISM premierships 
Oakleigh Grammar has won the following EISM premierships.

Boys:

 Basketball (2) - 2015, 2016
 Cross Country (4) - 2001, 2002, 2003, 2004
 Soccer (11) - 1998, 1999, 2004, 2005, 2006, 2013, 2014, 2015, 2016, 2017, 2019
 Table Tennis (3) - 2000, 2013, 2019
 Tennis (2) - 1999, 2016
 Volleyball (7) - 1999, 2004, 2005, 2006, 2013, 2016, 2017

Girls:

 Basketball - 2013
 Cross Country - 2013
 Netball - 2018
 Soccer (3) - 2015, 2017, 2020
 Soccer five-a-side (4) - 2015, 2016, 2017, 2018
 Softball - 2014
 Table Tennis (5) - 2015, 2016, 2017, 2018, 2019
 Volleyball (6) - 2009, 2013, 2015, 2016, 2017, 2018
 Indoor Soccer [Futsal ] 2022

References

External links
 Oakleigh Grammar website

Educational institutions established in 1983
Private schools in Victoria (Australia)
1983 establishments in Australia
Buildings and structures in the City of Monash